A list of films produced in Morocco in 1978.

1978

References

External links 

 Moroccan films of 1978 at the Internet Movie Database

1978
Moroccan
Films